The  opened in Saga, Saga Prefecture, Japan, in 1927. The museum building itself is a Registered Tangible Cultural Property dating from 1927. The collection includes the oldest extant Saibara score, a National Treasure.

See also

 List of National Treasures of Japan (writings: Japanese books)
 List of Cultural Properties of Japan - paintings (Saga)
 Saga Prefectural Museum

References

External links
  Chōkokan
  Collection database

Museums in Saga Prefecture
Museums established in 1927
1927 establishments in Japan
Saga (city)